Syngnathus affinis is a species of pipefish. It is found in the Black Sea.

References

Fish described in 1831
Fish of the Black Sea
affinis